24th ADG Awards
February 1, 2020

Period Film:
Once Upon a Time in Hollywood

Fantasy Film:
Avengers: Endgame

Contemporary Film:
Parasite

The 24th Art Directors Guild Excellence in Production Design Awards took place on February 1, 2020, at the InterContinental Los Angeles Downtown, honoring the best production designers of 2019. The nominations were announced on December 9, 2019.

Winners and nominees

Excellence in Production Design for Feature Film
 Period Film:
 Barbara Ling – Once Upon a Time in Hollywood 
 François Audouy – Ford v Ferrari
 Bob Shaw – The Irishman
 Ra Vincent – Jojo Rabbit
 Mark Friedberg – Joker
 Dennis Gassner – 1917

 Fantasy Film:
 Charles Wood – Avengers: Endgame
 Kevin Thompson – Ad Astra  
 Gemma Jackson – Aladdin
 Rick Heinrichs – Dumbo
 Patrick Tatopoulos – Maleficent: Mistress of Evil
 Rick Carter and Kevin Jenkins – Star Wars: The Rise of Skywalker

 Contemporary Film:
 Lee Ha-Jun – Parasite
 Jade Healy – A Beautiful Day in the Neighborhood
 Kevin Kavanaugh – John Wick: Chapter 3 - Parabellum
 David Crank – Knives Out
 Ruth De Jong – Us

 Animated Film:
 Bob Pauley – Toy Story 4
 Max Boas – Abominable 
 Michael Giaimo – Frozen II 
 Pierre-Olivier Vincent – How to Train Your Dragon: The Hidden World
 James Chinlund – The Lion King

Excellence in Production Design for Television
 One-Hour Period or Fantasy Single-Camera Television Series:
 Bill Groom – The Marvelous Mrs. Maisel (for "Ep. 305, Ep. 308")
 Bo Welch – A Series of Unfortunate Events (for "Penultimate Peril: Part 1")
 Martin Childs – The Crown (for "Aberfan")
 Andrew L. Jones – The Mandalorian (for "Chapter One")
 Deborah Riley – Game of Thrones (for "The Bells")
 
 One-Hour Contemporary Single-Camera Television Series:
 Mark Worthington – The Umbrella Academy (for “We Only See Each Other at Weddings and Funerals”)
 John Paino – Big Little Lies (for “What Have They Done?” “The Bad Mother,” “I Want to Know”)
 Dave Blass – The Boys (for “The Female of the Species”)
 Kay Lee – Euphorua (for “The Trials and Tribulations of Trying to Pee While Depressed,” “And Salt the Earth Behind You”)
 Elisabeth Williams – The Handmaid’s Tale (for “Mayday”)

 Television Movie or Limited Series:
 Luke Hull – Chernobyl 
 Anne Beauchamp – Black Mirror: Striking Vipers 
 David Gropman – Catch-22
 Maria Caso – Deadwood: The Movie
 Alex DiGerlando – Fosse/Verdon

 Half-Hour Single-Camera Television Series:
 Michael Bricker – Russian Doll (for "Nothing in This World Is Easy")
 Tyler B. Robinson – Barry (for "ronny/lily")
 Jonathan Paul Green – Fleabag (for “Ep. 5”)
 Todd Fjelsted – GLOW (for "Up, Up, Up")
 Ian Phillips – The Good Place (for "Employee of the Bearimy", "Help Is Other People")

 Multi-Camera Television Series:
 John Shaffner – The Big Bang Theory (for "The Stockholm Syndrome", "The Conference Valuation", "The Propagation Proposition")
 Stephan Olson – The Cool Kids (for "Vegas, Baby!")
 Aiyanna Trotter – Family Reunion (for "Remember Black Elvis?")
 Kristan Andrews – No Good Nick (for "The Italian Job")
 Glenda Rovello – Will & Grace (for "Family, Trip", "The Things We Do for Love", "Conscious Coupling")

 Short Format: Web Series, Music Video or Commercial:
 James Chinlund – MedMen ("The New Normal")
 Alex DiGerlando – Portal for Facebook: A Very Muppet Portal Launch
 Quito Cooksey – Apple ("It’s Tough Out There")
 Emma Fairley – Ariana Grande, Miley Cyrus, Lana Del Rey ("Don't Call Me Angel")
 Kurt Gefke – Taylor Swift ("Lover")

 Variety or Competition Series / Awards or Event Special:
 Monica Sotto – Drunk History (for "Are You Afraid of the Drunk?")
 David Korins – 91st Academy Awards
 Jason Sherwood – Rent: Live
 Keith Raywood, Akira Yoshimura, Joe DeTullio, Eugene Lee – Saturday Night Live (for "1764 Emma Stone," "1762 Sandra Oh," "1760 John Mulaney")
 Tamlyn Wright, Baz Halpin – Taylor Swift's Reputation Stadium Tour

References

2019 film awards
2019 guild awards
Art Directors Guild Awards
2019 in American cinema